Minuscule 910 (in the Gregory-Aland numbering), α168 (von Soden), is an 11th-century Greek minuscule manuscript of the New Testament on parchment.

Description 

The codex contains the text of the Book of Acts, Catholic epistles, and Pauline epistles, on 268 parchment leaves (size ). It has lacuna in Acts 20:20-35, the text of Acts 7:27-9:40 was relocated after Romans 3:16.

The text is written in one column per page, 18 lines per page.

Text 
The Greek text of the codex is a representative of the Byzantine text-type. Kurt Aland placed it in Category V.

History 

According to the colophon the manuscript was written in 1009 by Kiryllos Skythopulos. Currently the manuscript is dated by the INTF to the 11th century.

It was bought by Robert Curzon in 1834 in the monastery of Saba. C. R. Gregory saw it in 1883.
Facsimile was published in Parham Catalogue.

The manuscript was added to the list of New Testament manuscripts by Scrivener (216a, 234p) and Gregory (226a, 281p). In 1908 Gregory gave the number 910 to it.

It is currently housed in the British Library (Add MS 39598) in London.

See also 

 List of New Testament minuscules
 Minuscule 909
 Biblical manuscript
 Textual criticism

References

Further reading

External links 
 

Greek New Testament minuscules
11th-century biblical manuscripts
British Library additional manuscripts